The Lancia Beta "Autocarro" is a small commercial vehicle produced by the Italian company Lancia between 1950 and 1961. It was sold as the Z10 short wheelbase and Z11 long wheelbase model, and a rarer three-axle Z12 version. 

The Beta is a forward control layout, and was sold as a van, minibus, ambulance and pickup. In total, 6,700 of all of the versions were produced.

Beta
The Beta was launched with an innovative U-shaped four-cylinder engine, with a 1.9 litre (1908 cc) capacity producing .

In 1953, a new 2.0 litre (1963 cc) two-cylinder two-stroke engine built under licence from Detroit Diesel was available, producing .

Beta 190
The 190 is a light commercial vehicle with two seats and designed for carrying light goods. It uses a body from coachbuilders Viberti. This version of the vehicle has an engine rated at 35HP and a maximum speed of 52km/h.

The truck had a version with a tilt back for transporting products. It was used for transport in the milk system in north part of Italy.

References

Beta